Cyperus vestitus is a species of sedge that is native to southern parts of Africa.

See also 
 List of Cyperus species

References 

vestitus
Plants described in 1845
Flora of Kenya
Flora of South Africa
Flora of Rwanda
Flora of Malawi
Flora of Tanzania
Flora of Uganda
Flora of the Democratic Republic of the Congo
Taxa named by Christian Ferdinand Friedrich Krauss